The statue of George VI is a bronze sculpture by British artist Gilbert Ledward, installed at the Hong Kong Zoological and Botanical Gardens, in Hong Kong. The statue was erected in 1958 to commemorate Hong Kong's centennial, and replaced one depicting Arthur Kennedy.

References

External links
 

1958 establishments in Hong Kong
1958 sculptures
George VI
Cultural depictions of George VI
Monuments and memorials in Hong Kong
George VI
George VI
George VI
Works by British people
Central and Western District, Hong Kong